Preparis Island is an island which is part of the Yangon Region of Myanmar. Together, with the other Andaman Islands (the majority of which are a union territory of India), it marks the boundary between the Bay of Bengal and the Andaman Sea.

History
According to 19th century visitors, the island was uninhabited by humans, but many monkeys were observed. The island was host to the 78th Highlanders regiment when on 5 November 1816 their transport ship  hit an off-shore rock. Most passengers and crew survived as a freshwater supply was discovered and their stay was brief. The merchant ship  arrived on 10 November and between 11 and 14 November was able to rescue some 316 men, women, and children. The weather and damage to Prince Blucher prevented her from rescuing another hundred. The Government of Bengal then sent two cruisers that then rescued the remainder.

Geography
Preparis island makes up the northern end of the Andaman Islands chain.
Cow and Calf Islets
A group of 3 Flat-topped islets,  to the north.
West Reef Islets
A group of 3 islets,  to the west.
Preparis Pinnacle

Flora and fauna
The island is covered with low trees and bush. It has extensive flora coverage and area remains largely uncleared.

Administration
The island is subject to the Cocokyun township of Myanmar, along the Coco Islands.

Demographics
The island has about 50 inhabitants who engage in very small scale farming and fishing, mainly for the local consumption; part of a military unit that inhabits remote border outposts.

Transportation
Several beaches can cater for small supply craft. A small helipad serves the settlement.

See also
 Extreme points
 Rondo Island, Indonesia's northernmost island is closest to Indira Point
 Narcondam Island, India's easternmost point of Andaman Nicobar Islands group
 Landfall Island, India's northernmost island of Andaman Nicobar Islands group
 Extreme points of India
 Extreme points of Indonesia
 Extreme points of Myanmar
 Extreme points of Bangladesh
 Extreme points of Thailand
 List of islands of Burma

 Borders of Myanmar
 Bangladesh–Myanmar border
 China–Myanmar border
 India–Myanmar border
 Laos–Myanmar border
 Thailand–Myanmar border

References

External links 
 Official Nautical Chart

Populated places in Yangon Region
Islands of Myanmar